"Sweet Silver Lining" is a promo single from American singer-songwriter Kate Voegele's second studio album, A Fine Mess. This single, and the rest of her album, is produced by Mike Elizondo, who has worked with the likes of P!nk and Maroon 5.

Track listing
Digital download
 "Sweet Silver Lining" – 3:37

Charts

References

2009 singles
2009 songs
Interscope Records singles
Song recordings produced by Mike Elizondo